Saleh al-Arouri (born 19 August 1966), also transliterated as Salah al-Arouri or Salih al-Aruri, is a prominent leader of Hamas and founding commander of Izz ad-Din al-Qassam Brigades, the Hamas military. He is regarded as "the military commander of the West Bank." And as being "a capable, charismatic, suspicious, and shrewd operator, with excellent connections."

Al-Arouri founded the Izz ad-Din al-Qassam Brigades. The government of the United States accuses al-Arouri of having been, "a high-ranking Hamas military leader dating back to his role as a Hamas student cell leader at Hebron University in the early 1990s."

He also served as a recruiter, and was actively involved in raising and transferring funds on behalf of Hamas.  He remains the subject of a $5,000,000 bounty by the Rewards for Justice Program.

Education, recruitment and jail time 
Al-Arouri was born on 19 August 1966 in Ramallah in the West Bank. In 1985, he enrolled at Hebron University to study Sharia law. He was elected head of the Islamic faction at the university, where he established ties to Kutla Islamiya (Islamic Blocs), Hamas’ youth wing on campus. Through his connection to Kutla Islamiya, al-Arouri met Muin Shahib, a Bir University-based Hamas operative who recruited al-Arouri to the ranks of Hamas and entrusted him with funding of an infrastructure for Hamas’ military apparatus in Hebron.

In November 1990, al-Arouri was arrested by Israeli authorities. He spent only six months in jail, but was arrested again shortly after. Initially held on administrative detention, he spent  15 years in jail for his leadership role in Hamas.

In 2007, al-Arouri was arrested again by the Israeli authorities and released in March 2010, probably for his decisive role in the release of Israeli soldier Gilad Shalit who was captured by Hamas in 2006. Al-Arouri was later expelled from Gaza as his presence was reputed to pose a threat to Israel.

When he was released from prison in Israel in 2007, he told interviewers that he abjured terrorist attacks, asserting that Hamas is "harmed if we target civilians." He was deported by Israel shortly after his release from prison and moved to Damascus, Syria, where he joined Hamas’ political bureau headed by Khaled Meshaal. When Khaled Meshal left Damascus at the inception of the Syrian Civil War, al-Arouri relocated to Istanbul, where he established his own bureau.

Al-Arouri is believed to be living in Turkey, although in December 2015, rumors circulated that he had voluntarily left the country and was "shuttling between Lebanon and Qatar." Qatar has hosted Khaled Meshaal, Hamas’ political leader, as well as Hamas’ political bureau, for years. Ynet News reported that Al-Arouri’s departure was part of the reconciliation efforts between Turkey and Israel, and was discussed during the meeting held in early December between Turkish President Tayyip Erdoğan, Turkish Prime Minister Ahmet Davutoğlu, and Hamas’ political leader Khaled Meshal.

Leadership and strategy 
Al-Arouri is usually portrayed as a pragmatic leader, in contrast with Hamas leadership’s hardline policy.

From Istanbul, al-Arouri has allegedly operated independently from the rest of the organization, thereby fostering existing leadership issues in Hamas, an organization multi-headed by design. In fact, Hamas’ Turkey branch is generally described to be taking decisions without taking into account the movement as a whole and without involving the Hamas leadership.

According to Matthew Levitt of the Washington Institute for Near East Policy, a think tank, al-Arouri "has been a key figure behind Hamas’ efforts to rejuvenate the group’s terrorist networks in the West Bank." Levitt asserts that he has dispatched, "dozens of operatives" to Israel with funds to carry out the terror kidnapping of Israelis with the goal of obtaining kidnappees to exchange for Palestinian security prisoners.

Some of Al Qassam Brigades’ activities aimed at establishing a Hamas cell in Hebron specialized on kidnapping of Israeli soldiers. In fact, Hamas believes that this strategy is one of the most effective to secure the release of its affiliates. Al Qassam Brigades and the Hamas cell in Hebron are run from remote locations, and have often benefited from help coming from outside the Israeli territories. This was evident since 2013, when Israel Defense Forces (IDF) and Israel Security Agency (Shin Bet) arrested 20 terrorists affiliated with Hamas that had been assisted by Hamas operatives abroad with "guidance and funding." Israeli authorities revealed that the primary contact of the cell abroad was Husam Badran, who was released in 2011 and exiled to Qatar as part of the Shalit deal.

Al-Arouri said in a conference in Turkey on 20 August 2014 that Hamas was responsible for the 2014 kidnapping and murder of Israeli teenagers. However, his claim was doubted by experts. The Israeli defense establishment thinks al-Arouri was boasting and was unconnected to the kidnapping.

Al-Arouri is regarded as the author of a recent series of incidents of terrorism against Israelis, including the 2015 Shvut Rachel shooting and the shooting of Danny Gonen. His focus is on building Hamas military capacity in the West Bank, by smuggling in weapons and establishing sleeper cells.

Financial activities 
Criminal prosecution documents related to the case of two US-based Hamas officers convicted in 2007, Muhammad Hamid Khalil Salah and Abdelhaleem Hasan Abdelraziz Ashqar, in which al-Arouri was an unindicted co-conspirator, described his involvement in financial transactions on behalf of Hamas.

According to the proceedings, al-Arouri received "tens of thousands of dollars for Hamas-related activities" and "used the funds provided by defendant Salah for the purchase of weapons that were to be used in terrorist attacks."

In September 2015, the US Treasury sanctioned al-Arouri for being "responsible… for money transfers for Hamas." The US Treasury claimed that al-Aruri directed and overseen "the distribution of Hamas finances" and portrayed him as "a key financier and financial facilitator for Hamas military cells planning attacks and fomenting unrest."

In 2011, al-Arouri had facilitated fund transfers to the families of convicted terrorists and deceased Hamas officers in coordination with Saudi Arabia-based Hamas financial officer Mahir Salah.

US authorities also posited that as of 2014, al-Arouri was leading a Hamas initiative that would have destabilized the Palestinian Authority and would have prepared Hamas’ takeover. Moreover, Al Arouri allegedly "financed and directed a Hamas cell in the West Bank that sought to instigate clashes between Israeli and Palestinian forces."

More in general, in 2014, al-Arouri was in charge of several Hamas military cells both in the West Bank and in Jordan. The US Treasury claimed that by then, he had "facilitated the transfer of hundreds of thousands of dollars to Hamas, including to the Izzedine al-Qassam Brigades, the military wing of Hamas, for the purchase of arms and storage facilities for weapons." Al-Arouri succeeded in establishing solid ties between the West bank cells and Hamas’s U.S.-based financiers. In this connection, terror finance expert Matthew Levitt claimed that al-Arouri "played a critical intermediary role between otherwise compartmented elements of Hamas’s external leadership and on-the-ground operatives."

Diplomatic activities 
Al-Arouri has often travelled and attended official meetings as part of Hamas delegations. In March 2012, he met with Turkish President Erdoğan. In October 2012, he attended the visit of the Qatari emir to the Gaza Strip.

COVID-19 pandemic 
On 3 October 2020, al-Arouri tested positive for COVID-19.

References

Hamas leaders
1966 births
People from Bani Zeid al-Sharqiya
Hebron University alumni
Living people